This is a list of administrative counties and county boroughs of England by population as at the 1971 census.

Administrative counties
Administrative counties did not include the county boroughs, see below for their populations.

County boroughs

References
1971 census

1971 United Kingdom census
Lists of counties of England
1971 in England